Merenna Koralage Don Ishara Amerasinghe (born 5 March 1978), or Ishara Amerasinghe, is a Sri Lankan cricketer who attended Nalanda College Colombo. A right-arm fast-medium bowler with a side-on action, Amerasinghe was named in the 30-man provincial squad for the 2007 World Cup. Samarasinghe is the 108th Sri Lanka Test Cap, where he debut against West Indies  at Port of Spain West Indies in 2007/08.

International career
He is probably the second fastest bowler in Sri Lanka, behind Lasith Malinga. Despite not making it to the Caribbean he was selected in the Sri Lankan squad for a post World Cup tournament against Pakistan at Abu Dhabi. He made his One Day International debut in the first game of the series but failed to take a wicket. However, he made significant strides in the 2008 CB series, where he picked up 8 wickets at 35.75 each.

References
 It’s a win that hides much
 Cricket stars pay homage to Anura Ranasinghe

External links
 

1978 births
Burgher Recreation Club cricketers
Colts Cricket Club cricketers
Living people
Nondescripts Cricket Club cricketers
Sri Lanka One Day International cricketers
Sri Lanka Test cricketers
Sri Lankan cricketers
Alumni of Nalanda College, Colombo
Wayamba cricketers
Basnahira cricketers
Galle Cricket Club cricketers
Basnahira Cricket Dundee cricketers